Bahram Mashhoon (born 9 September 1947) is an Iranian-American physicist known for his research in General Relativity.

Mashhoon is a professor at the University of Missouri in Columbia, Missouri, where he deals with some foundational aspects of gravitational physics. Within his field of research,  Mashhoon has given important contributions to general relativity, with particular emphasis on the gravitomagnetic clock effect, but also as far as cosmology is concerned. He is also active in the field of non-local gravity.

Mashhoon received his Ph.D. in physics from Princeton University in 1972 after completing a doctoral dissertation, titled "The gravitational and electromagnetic interactions of a black hole", under the supervision of John Archibald Wheeler.

Son of Hassan Mashhoon, author of the book History of Iranian Music

Bibliometric information 
As of November 2013,  the h-index of Mashhoon released by the NASA ADS database is 33, with more than 2800 citations (self-citations excluded). His tori index and riq index are 91.3 and 222, respectively.

References

External links
Bahram Mashhoon's personal webpage at Missouri University
General Relativity and Gravitation special issue dedicated to 60th birthday of prof. B. Mashhoon
List of publications by B. Mashhoon

21st-century American physicists
Living people
American people of Iranian descent
Princeton University alumni
University of Missouri faculty
Iranian expatriate academics
Year of birth missing (living people)
University of Missouri physicists